Haribhau Kisanrao Bagade  (born 17 August 1945) is an Indian politician from Maharashtra state. He was the Speaker of Maharashtra Legislative Assembly in 2014, and he is a leader of Bharatiya Janata Party.

Haribhau Bagade was born in a Maratha family in Phulambri town of Aurangabad district.

He was first elected to Maharashtra Vidhan Sabha in 1985 from Aurangabad East seat. He won 2014 MLA election against Kalyan Kale of Indian National Congress (INC) from Phulambri constituency, and went on to win the 2019 assembly election as well from the same constituency.  When BJP installed its first government in Maharashtra in 2014, he was appointed Speaker of Maharashtra Legislative Assembly. He is a former cabinet minister in Government of Maharashtra.

References

Living people
Maharashtra MLAs 1995–1999
State cabinet ministers of Maharashtra
People from Aurangabad district, Maharashtra
Speakers of the Maharashtra Legislative Assembly
People from Marathwada
Maharashtra MLAs 2014–2019
Maharashtra MLAs 1985–1990
Bharatiya Janata Party politicians from Maharashtra
1945 births